The Boxing  event at the 2022 Mediterranean Games was held in Oran, Algeria, from 26 June to 1 July 2022. For the first time, boxing for women is included in the Mediterranean Games.

Medal table

Medalists

Men's events

Women's events

References

External links
Official site
Results book

 
Sports at the 2022 Mediterranean Games
2022
Mediterranean Games